Anna is an upcoming biographical film about the late Russian journalist Anna Politkovskaya. Directed by James Strong, it is set to star Maxine Peak as Politkovskaya, Jason Isaacs as her husband Sascha, and Ciaran Hinds as her Nobel peace prize winning editor at the Novaya Gazeta, Dmitry Muratov.

Synopsis
Anna Politkovskaya was a journalist and human rights activist who persisted with reporting on the conflict in Chechnya despite considerable danger to herself, and tried to expose corruption within Russia under the governance of Vladimir Putin. She continued in the face of poisoning, intimidation and violence before being the victim of a contract killing in the elevator of her house on October 7, 2006.

Cast
Maxine Peak as Anna Politkovskaya
Ciaran Hinds as Dmitry Muratov
Jason Isaacs as Alexander Politkovsky
Naomi Battrick as Vera Politkovskaya
Harry Lawtey as Ilya Politkovsky
Ellie Bamber as Elena

Production
The project was announced as Mother Russia at the 2022 Cannes Film Festival with Maxine Peak, Jason Isaacs, and Ciaran Hinds attached to the main roles. The film had James Strong attached as director, working from a screenplay by Eric Poppen, and was announced to be made by the production company Luminosity, with filming scheduled for UK and Latvia in 2022. Producers were listed as Dean Altit, David Banks, Paul Brennan, Kia Jam, and Miriam Segal. With co-production from Forma Pro Films at their Latvian studios, K. Jam Media, and BuzzFeed Studios, with a reported budget of $13 million. 

In February 2023, the family of Anna Politkovskaya released a joint statement expressing concern about the factual accuracy of the script they had been given at the start of production, that they had not contributed in any way, nor had they granted permission for their names to be used in the film.

Casting
In September 2022, Emma D'Arcy, Harry Lawtey and Ellie Bamber were added to the cast, with the project title being changed from Mother Russia to Anna. Lawtey confirmed his role as Anna Politkovskaya's son and discussed the film within a geo-political context saying "The film has been planned for years and obviously now it has unfortunately become too relevant... Being part of a project that feels current and meaningful is a privilege." D'Arcy was replaced by Naomi Battrick due to scheduling issues.

Principal photography
Selling rights to the film became held by Film Bridge International from Luminosity in late 2022. Principal photography was revealed by Deadline to have commenced in Latvia in December 2022, with filming scheduled to last into February 2023.

References

External links
 

2020s British films
2020s English-language films
Upcoming films
British biographical drama films
2020s biographical drama films
Films about journalists
Films set in Russia
Films about murder
Films about assassinations